Green Flash (2008), also known as Beach Kings, is a comedy-drama film starring David Charvet, Torrey DeVitto and Kristin Cavallari. Other stars of the film include Bree Turner, Christine Adams, Wilson Cruz and Matt Prokop. The film was directed by Paul Nihipali Jr. and produced by Joseph Barmettler, Cameron Dieterich and Bob Smiland. Shot in Los Angeles, Las Vegas, Hermosa Beach and Manhattan Beach, it was released on June 5, 2008.

Background 
Green Flash is writer and producer Paul Nihipali Jr.'s directorial debut. He wanted to share the "true insides of a sport and a subculture" he knows very well. He is a two-time NCAA Champion and three-time All-American for the UCLA's men's volleyball team in the 1990s and a former member of the U.S. National Volleyball Team.

Plot

At age thirty, Cameron Day has given up his chances at pro-basketball fame and settled into an aimless life. The mental demands of being a professional athlete were just too much for Cameron to handle, and just as he was set to break big in the world of professional sports, the once-promising athlete mysteriously vanished for ten long years. A chance encounter with a beautiful woman lands him smack in the middle of Southern California's pro beach volleyball scene. Mia helps to enlighten Cameron by teaching him about the Green Flash: that fleeting moment when the sun falls over the horizon and all of nature become completely brilliant for a fraction of a second. A naturally talented true athlete, he seems destined for sports stardom once again until his old demons start creeping in, threatening his chances at success.

Cast
David Charvet as Cameron Day, once upon a time basketball star disappeared from the world of sports only to resurface on the shores of Southern California with the dream of winning volleyball’s most prestigious event: The Manhattan Open
Torrey DeVitto as Mia Fonseca, the brunette beach beauty
Kristin Cavallari as Lana, the ring leader of The Volley Dollies
Brody Hutzler as Jeremy Madden, one of the top dogs on the AVP tour
Court Young as Kenny Fonseca, the Marine Street Gang’s eternal good guy
Jaleel White as Jason Bootie
Jason Olive as D'arrel LaCroix
Bret Roberts as Verde
Jason Ring as Ima
Albert Hannemann as Kimo
Eric Fonoimoana as Sonny
Danny Farmer as Grubbs
Lindsey Borden as Heather
Lauren Rauth as Cassidy
Cristin Schult as Amberly

References

External links
 
 Beach Kings on Rotten Tomatoes

2008 films
American independent films
2008 comedy-drama films
Films about sportspeople
American sports comedy-drama films
2008 independent films
2000s English-language films
2000s American films